Amalgamated Power Engineering was a British engineering holding company, created through the 1968 merger of W.H. Allen, Sons and Co (which had absorbed William Foster & Co. in 1960) and Belliss and Morcom. 

In 1966, the receiver of Crossley Brothers of Manchester, sold the Crossley-Premier Engines and Furnival and Co businesses to Belliss and Morcom (B&M) of Birmingham, West Midlands. In 1968 B&M agreed a merger with W.H. Allen, Sons and Co of Bedford, to form Amalgamated Power Engineering (APE), 60% owned by Allen's shareholders (which included William Foster & Co.) and 40% by Belliss and Morcom; which instantly became a leading manufacturer of engines. In 1968, APE reached agreement with Cooper-Bessemer to allow C-B to sell APE's gas treatment plant worldwide. In 1969, APE's Allen Gwynnes Pumps subsidiary acquired the industrial pumps business of Vickers plc based in Barrow in Furness.

After a difficult period in the 1970s, when due to ongoing losses APE sold a number of subsidiaries, in 1981 APE was acquired by Northern Engineering Industries plc, based in Gosforth, Newcastle upon Tyne. NEI shut most of the old central-Birmingham factories, consolidated the products around compressors, and moved B&M to Redditch. NEI itself was then acquired by Rolls-Royce plc in 1989.

References

Technology companies established in 1968
Technology companies disestablished in 1981
Defunct engineering companies of England
Rolls-Royce
1968 establishments in England
Former defence companies of the United Kingdom
1981 disestablishments in England
1981 mergers and acquisitions
British companies disestablished in 1981
British companies established in 1968